General Mercer may refer to:

Cavalié Mercer (1783–1868), British Army general
Charles F. Mercer (1778–1858), Virginia State Militia brigadier general
David Mercer (Royal Marines officer) (1864–1920), Royal Marines major general
Hugh Mercer (1726–1777), Continental Army brigadier general
Hugh W. Mercer (1808–1877), Confederate States Army brigadier general
Malcolm Mercer (1859–1916), Canadian Army major general
Roosevelt Mercer Jr. (fl. 1970s–2000s), U.S. Air Force major general

See also
Auguste Mercier (1833–1921), French Army general
Denis Mercier (born 1959), French Air Force general